Kombolokoura is a town in northern Ivory Coast. It is a sub-prefecture of Korhogo Department in Poro Region, Savanes District.

Kombolokoura was a commune until March 2012, when it became one of 1126 communes nationwide that were abolished.

In 2014, the population of the sub-prefecture of Kombolokoura was 5,739.

Villages
The 8 villages of the sub-prefecture of Kombolokoura and their population in 2014 are:
 Kabevogo (466)
 Karaniene (347)
 Kazievogo (323)
 Kombolokoura (2 581)
 Litio (627)
 N'djanhon (392)
 Ouombolo (825)
 Tialoho (178)

Notes

Sub-prefectures of Poro Region
Former communes of Ivory Coast